= Cyfrinach y Bedyddwyr =

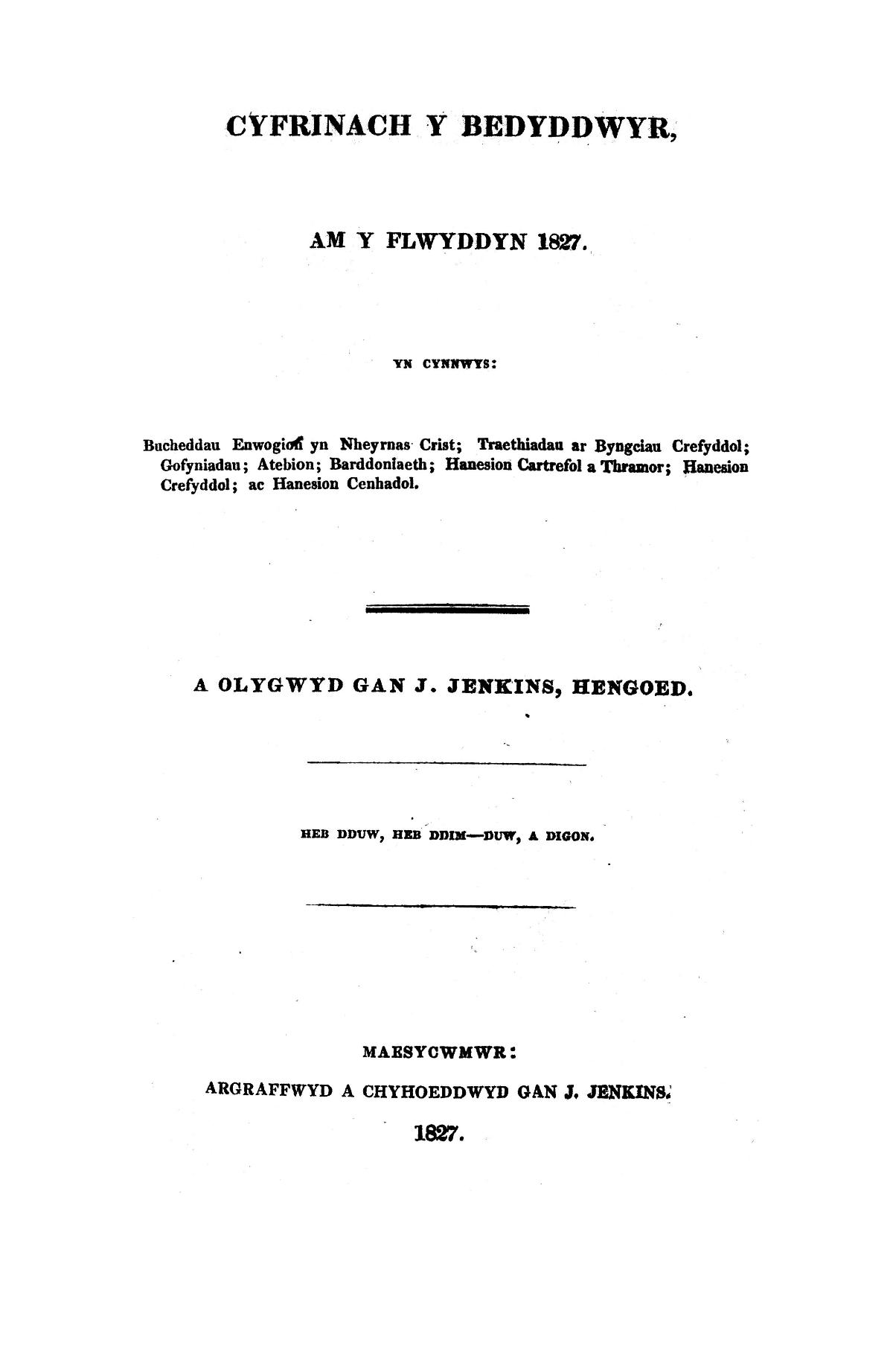
Cyfrinach y Bedyddwyr (Welsh Journal)

Cyfrinach y Bedyddwyr was a 19th-century monthly Welsh language magazine, first produced by its founder, Baptist minister John Jenkins (1779–1853), in Merthyr Tydfil in 1827. Its contents were aimed at members of the Baptist congregations of Glamorganshire and Monmouthshire.
